Samuel L. Fiocchi (born October 1, 1952) is an American Republican politician who has represented the 1st Legislative District in the New Jersey General Assembly from January 14, 2014 to January 12, 2016. He took office after he defeated Nelson Albano in the 2013 general election.

Fiocchi was born and raised in Vineland, New Jersey and attended St. Augustine Preparatory School and Widener University. Fiocchi had been a member of the Cumberland County Board of Chosen Freeholders from 2011 to 2013 for one term and had been a member of the Vineland Zoning Board from 2009 to 2011. He is also a real estate agent and served on the transition team for Chris Christie in 2010.

During his term in the Assembly, he served on the Human Services, Regulatory Oversight, and Telecommunications and Utilities committees. After serving one term, he and Republican running mate, Cumberland County Freeholder Jim Sauro, were defeated by incumbent Democrat Bob Andrzejczak and his running mate R. Bruce Land.

References

External links
 
Ballotpedia - Samuel Fiocchi

Living people
1952 births
Republican Party members of the New Jersey General Assembly
County commissioners in New Jersey
People from Vineland, New Jersey
Politicians from Cumberland County, New Jersey
St. Augustine Preparatory School alumni
Widener University alumni
21st-century American politicians